Luther Davis is a former NCAA Division I football player for the University of Alabama who, in late 2013, became the subject of alleged violations of collegiate amateurism rules.

Alabama Football
Davis was one of Nick Saban's first big recruits at Alabama.  Ranked as the 15th best defensive tackle of the 2007 class by Rivals.com; Davis stunned the college football world by reneging on his commitment to Louisiana State University in his native Louisiana.

Davis went on to play for the Crimson Tide for four years.  He participated in Alabama's 2009 BCS Championship season, playing in all 14 games.

Post-collegiate activity

On September 11, 2013, Yahoo! Sports reported that Davis had acted as a sports agent or as a bagman for sports agents during late 2011 and early 2012.  The news article was accompanied by subsequent reports containing facsimiles of receipts for flights and money transfers, as well as text messages which corroborate the evidence Yahoo Sports presented in its original story.

The documents and text messages indicate Davis made direct payments - as well as provided substantial benefits - to several collegiate football players.  Davis reportedly provided payments and benefits into the several thousands of dollars to former Alabama offensive lineman D. J. Fluker.

References

American sports agents
Alabama Crimson Tide football players
Living people
Year of birth missing (living people)